Riverhead Post Office is a United States post office located at 1210 West Main Street in Riverhead, New York. It serves the ZIP code 11901, covering all of Riverhead, along with Roanoke, Reeves Park, Centerville, northern Jamesport, and northwestern Laurel.

The old Riverhead Post Office was designed by Louis A. Simon who was Supervising Architect for the United States Treasury Department. Simon also designed the Post Office buildings in Bay Shore, Northport, and Westhampton Beach. According to the Riverhead Town Historian, the land for the Post Office was purchased in 1932, with the building erected in 1935 and dedicated in November of that year. The post office was a depression-era public works project.  It is built in a simplified Colonial Revival style.

As with Patchogue and Smithtown's Village of the Branch, Riverhead Post Office was known as a source for obscure postal denominations by Long Island-based stamp collectors. The building was added to the National Register of Historic Places in 1989.

References

External links
Suffolk County Listings at a private website copying National Register of Historic Places information

Riverhead, New York
Riverhead (town), New York
Colonial Revival architecture in New York (state)
Government buildings completed in 1935
National Register of Historic Places in Suffolk County, New York
Buildings and structures in Suffolk County, New York